South Davis Millpond Branch is a  long second-order tributary to Davis Millpond Branch in Dorchester County, Maryland.  This is the only stream of this name in the United States.

Course

Watershed
South Davis Millpond Branch drains  of area, receives about 44.5 in/year of precipitation, and is about 5.01% forested.

See also
List of Maryland rivers

References

Rivers of Maryland
Rivers of Dorchester County, Maryland
Tributaries of the Nanticoke River